Chris Martin is a Scottish actor and writer. He is best known for the role of Paul Brennan in River City and as Michael in Open Mike in which he was nominated for the Best Actor accolade at the 2016 British Academy Scotland New Talent Awards. He also appeared as Callaghan in the short film Autumn Never Dies.

Chris’ writing credits include Open Mike and Regrets with his third short film in pre-production as well as collaborating on several other forthcoming projects including a documentary based around Muay Thai.

Filmography

Awards and nominations

References

External links

Living people
Alumni of the University of the West of Scotland
Scottish male film actors
Scottish male stage actors
Scottish male television actors
21st-century Scottish male actors
Male actors from Glasgow
1980 births